The United States Senate Armed Services Subcommittee on Cybersecurity is one of seven subcommittees within the Senate Armed Services Committee.

Jurisdiction

The Cybersecurity Subcommittee has primary jurisdiction over all policies and programs related to cyber forces and capabilities. The subcommittee also oversees the United States Cyber Command and the cyber components of other United States Department of Defense commands and agencies.

Members, 118th Congress

Historical subcommittee rosters

117th Congress

116th Congress

115th Congress

References

External links
Senate Armed Services Committee home page
Senate Armed Services Committee subcommittee list and membership page

Armed Services Cybersecurity